The Committee of National Unity (Spanish: Comité de Unidad Nacional, CUN) was a right-wing self-styled "technocratic" organization of moderate conservative business and government leaders in Bolivia.

The CUN was founded by Hernán Antelo Laughlin, Fastón Villa and Renald MacLean in November 1977.

In 1978 the Committee of National Unity took part in an electoral coalition Nationalist Union of the People backing  Juan Pereda Asbún.

In 1979, the CUN dissolved into Hugo Banzer Suárez's new Nationalist Democratic Action (ADN).

Notes

Conservative parties in Bolivia
Defunct political parties in Bolivia
Political parties established in 1977
1977 establishments in Bolivia
Political parties disestablished in 1979
1979 disestablishments in Bolivia